The 2017 German Darts Open was the third of twelve PDC European Tour events on the 2017 PDC Pro Tour. The tournament took place at Saarlandhalle, Saarbrücken, Germany, between 21–23 April 2017. It featured a field of 48 players and £135,000 in prize money, with £25,000 going to the winner.

Peter Wright won the tournament by defeating Benito van de Pas 6–5 in the final.

Prize money
This is how the prize money is divided:

Qualification and format
The top 16 players from the PDC ProTour Order of Merit on 6 April automatically qualified for the event and were seeded in the second round.

The remaining 32 places went to players from five qualifying events - 18 from the UK Qualifier (held in Barnsley on 7 April), eight from the West/South European Qualifier, four from the Host Nation Qualifier (both held on 20 April), one from the Nordic & Baltic Qualifier (held on 18 February) and one from the East European Qualifier (held on 26 February).

The following players took part in the tournament:

Top 16
  Michael van Gerwen (quarter-finals)
  Peter Wright (champion)
  Mensur Suljović (quarter-finals)
  Benito van de Pas (runner-up)
  Simon Whitlock (third round)
  Dave Chisnall (third round)
  Alan Norris  (second round)
  Ian White (semi-finals)
  Kim Huybrechts (second round)
  Gerwyn Price (quarter-finals)
  Jelle Klaasen (semi-finals)
  Michael Smith (second round)
  Joe Cullen (third round)
  Stephen Bunting (third round)
  Cristo Reyes (third round)
  Steve West (second round)

UK Qualifier 
  James Richardson (second round)
  Mervyn King (third round)
  Paul Nicholson (second round)
  Nathan Aspinall (second round)
  Mark Walsh (second round)
  Brian Woods (first round)
  Robbie Green (first round)
  Darren Webster  (second round)
  Josh Payne (first round)
  Peter Jacques (first round)
  Robert Thornton (first round)
  Andy Hamilton (first round)
  John Henderson (first round)
  Adam Hunt (third round)
  Rob Cross (quarter-finals)
  Steve Lennon (first round)
  Jamie Bain (first round)
  Warrick Scheffer (second round)

West/South European Qualifier
  Dirk van Duijvenbode (first round)
  Zoran Lerchbacher (first round)
  Ronny Huybrechts (second round)
  Jeffrey de Graaf (first round)
  Christian Kist (second round)
  Jimmy Hendriks (first round)
  Vincent van der Voort (second round)
  Dimitri Van den Bergh (third round)

Host Nation Qualifier
  Bernd Roith (second round)
  René Berndt (first round)
  Martin Schindler (first round)
  Nico Blum (second round)

Nordic & Baltic Qualifier
  Marko Kantele (first round)

East European Qualifier
  Krzysztof Ratajski (second round)

Draw

References

2017 PDC European Tour
2017 in German sport